Bangin West Coast is the second album by Long Beach, California producer and rapper Soopafly. The advance leaked in 2006 but was officially released on May 8, 2007 through Gangsta Advisory Records.

Track listing

Album Chart Awards
This Album was never charted on the Billboard but has nearly sold 3,200 copies world wide today.

Credits

References

2007 albums
Soopafly albums
Albums produced by Battlecat (producer)
Albums produced by Mr. Porter
Albums produced by Exile (producer)
Albums produced by Soopafly